Art & Copy is a 2009 documentary film, directed by Doug Pray, about the advertising industry in the U.S. The film follows the careers of advertisers, including Hal Riney, George Lois, Mary Wells Lawrence, Dan Wieden, and Lee Clow. The documentary covers advertising campaigns such as "Just Do It", "I Love New York", "Where's the Beef?", "I Want My MTV", "Got Milk?", and "Think Different". It premiered at the 2009 Sundance Film Festival in the US Documentary Competition.

Cast 

 Lee Clow
 Jim Durfee
 Cliff Freeman
 Jeff Goodby
 David Kennedy
 George Lois
 Charlie Moss
 Hal Riney
 Phyllis K. Robinson
 Ed Rollins
 Rich Silverstein
 Mary Wells
 Dan Wieden

Reception
The film won the 2011 News & Documentary Emmy Award for Outstanding Arts & Culture Programming.

Although reviews were generally favorable, some reviewers chastised the film for presenting an uncritical view of advertising.

The film was promoted in various movie theaters and design universities in Mexico with the help of Brands&People, an advertising agency in Monterrey.

References

External links
 
 
 New York Times review (August 21, 2009)
  New York Post review (September 2, 2009)
 The A. V. Club review (August 20, 2009)
 Art & Copy site for Independent Lens on PBS

2009 films
Documentary films about advertising
2009 documentary films
American documentary films
Films directed by Doug Pray
2000s English-language films
2000s American films
English-language documentary films